Araceli Aipoh (née Bañez) is a Filipino-Nigerian writer.

Biography
Born and raised in the Philippines as Araceli Banez, she graduated with a degree in Mass Communication (major in Journalism, minor in Comparative Literature) from the University of the Philippines Baguio in the Philippines.

Career
From 1996 to 2006, she lived and worked in Lagos, Nigeria, during which she wrote No Sense of Limits, her first novel. It was completed and published in 2005. While working on the novel, Aipoh wrote columns for various publications based in Lagos.

Recently, she has taken up photography as a hobby and enjoys capturing images of people from all walks of life. From November 2010 to October 2011, her photos and short write-ups pertaining to diplomatic, cultural, social, literary and educational events in Abuja appeared in her own weekly column, Metro Zone, with LeVogue, supplementary magazine of Leadership Saturday Newspaper.

She is the editor and co-publisher of Inside Track Abuja, a magazine that focuses on events in and around the FCT and is available online through a blog of the same name.

Personal life
She is a member of various organisations in Nigeria such as the Filipino-Nigerian Families Association, the Abuja Branch of Nigerwives Nigeria, the Abuja International Women's Club, and the Pusong Pinoy Filipino Association.

She is currently based in Abuja where she maintains a day job at the personnel department of a construction company. She writes for pleasure, during her spare time. She is married to Peter Aipoh, a medical doctor from Edo State.

They have lived in Nigeria since 1987 and have four grown up children.

References 

Nigerian writers
Living people
Nigerian people of Filipino descent
University of the Philippines Baguio alumni
People from Abuja
Year of birth missing (living people)